The high jump was first contested in the 1976 Summer Paralympics for men and women. However, the women's high jump is now discontinued with the last event being held in the 2000 Summer Paralympics.

Men's medal summaries

Amputee athletes

Blind athletes

Intellectually impaired athletes

Women's medal summaries

See also
Athletics at the Olympics
High jump at the Olympics

References

Athletics at the Summer Paralympics
High jump